USS Chippewa was a brig built in 1815 at Warren, Rhode Island, under the direction of Commodore Oliver Perry, and sent to New York City to be outfitted and manned. Chippewa sailed from Boston, Massachusetts, 3 July 1815, with Lieutenant George C. Read in command, as a part of a squadron under the command of Commodore William Bainbridge. It was intended to go to the Mediterranean for use against the Barbary pirates based in North Africa. 

Before the squadron's arrival in the Mediterranean, another squadron under the command of Commodore Stephen Decatur had succeeded in making peace with the Dey of Algiers. Bainbridge, after showing the flag in several ports in the Mediterranean, departed for home 6 October 1815. Upon her arrival at Boston, Chippewa was placed in ordinary service.

Chippewa sailed from Boston 27 November 1816 for the Gulf of Mexico to join the frigate Congress in the anti-piracy and anti-slave trade patrols in the Caribbean. The United States and Britain were cooperating in attempts to suppress the international slave trade. Chippewa ran aground on an uncharted reef at the North West of Providenciales, Turks & Caicos Islands and sank on 12 December 1816 without loss of life.

Post-script

In 2008, a U.S expedition supported by the National Oceanic and Atmospheric Administration searching with representatives of Turks & Caicos Islands seeking Trouvadore, a Spanish slave ship that wrecked in 1841 in the same area, found the wreck of Chippewa. They had found wreckage of a wooden ship in 2004, and 2008 was the third field season. Chippewa was identified by the unique 32-pounder carronade armament.

References

External links
 "Search for the Trouvadore 2008: Mission Summary", Explorations, NOAA, includes slideshow and videos
 "Anti-piracy/Anti-slavery patrols", Slave Ship Trouvadore website
 "US Brig Chippewa: contemporary history", Slave Ship Trouvadore, official website
 "US Brig Chippewa: modern wreck history", Slave Ship Trouvadore, official website

 

Brigs of the United States Navy
Maritime incidents in 1816
Shipwrecks of the Turks and Caicos Islands
Shipwrecks in the Atlantic Ocean
Ships built in Warren, Rhode Island
1815 ships
Barbary slave trade
Anti-slavery military operations